Troy Clarke is an Australian former rugby league footballer who played in the 1980s and 1990s. He played for the Newcastle Knights from 1988 to 1989 and the Canterbury Bulldogs in 1992.  Clarke then moved to England and played 2 seasons for Leigh.

Playing career
Clarke was an inaugural player for Newcastle and made his debut for the club in 1988 against defending premiers Manly-Warringah which ended in a 44-12 defeat.  In 1992, Clarke joined Canterbury-Bankstown playing 1 season for the club.  In 1993, Clarke joined English side Leigh and played 2 seasons at the club before retiring at the end of 1994.

References

External links
http://www.rugbyleagueproject.org/players/Troy_Clarke/summary.html

Australian rugby league players
Canterbury-Bankstown Bulldogs players
Carlisle RLFC players
Leigh Leopards players
Living people
Newcastle Knights players
Rugby articles needing expert attention
1967 births